Millersville is a city in Robertson and Sumner counties, Tennessee. The population was 5,308 at the 2000 census and 6,440 in 2010.

Geography

According to the United States Census Bureau, the city has a total area of 13.5 square miles (35.0 km2), all land.

Demographics

2000 Census
As of the census of 2000, there were 5,308 people, 1,990 households, and 1,484 families residing in the city. The population density was 393.2 people per square mile (151.8/km2). There were 2,098 housing units at an average density of 155.4 per square mile (60.0/km2). The racial makeup of the city was 93.99% White, 3.52% African American, 0.47% Native American, 0.64% Asian, 0.02% Pacific Islander, 0.55% from other races, and 0.81% from two or more races. Hispanic or Latino of any race were 1.51% of the population.

There were 1,990 households, out of which 38.5% had children under the age of 18 living with them, 58.0% were married couples living together, 11.1% had a female householder with no husband present, and 25.4% were non-families. 19.1% of all households were made up of individuals, and 3.6% had someone living alone who was 65 years of age or older. The average household size was 2.66 and the average family size was 3.02.

In the city, the population was spread out, with 27.9% under the age of 18, 9.1% from 18 to 24, 36.4% from 25 to 44, 20.2% from 45 to 64, and 6.4% who were 65 years of age or older. The median age was 32 years. For every 100 females, there were 103.3 males. For every 100 females age 18 and over, there were 98.9 males.

The median income for a household in the city was $40,840, and the median income for a family was $47,868. Males had a median income of $31,013 versus $24,057 for females. The per capita income for the city was $17,764. About 9.9% of families and 11.8% of the population were below the poverty line, including 15.3% of those under age 18 and 16.0% of those age 65 or over.

Estimates, July 2009

As of July 2009 the population was 6,471, an increase of 21.9% from 2000. The racial make up was 93.7% White, 3.2% Black, 2.9% Hispanic and .2% Other. The average age of Millersville residents is 32 years old. The average income is $41,638. The unemployment is 9.5%.

2020 Census

As of the 2020 United States census, there were 6,299 people, 2,525 households, and 1,663 families residing in the city.

References

External links
 http://www.cityofmillersville.com/
 https://web.archive.org/web/20110706203009/http://2010.census.gov/2010census/data/
 http://www.city-data.com/city/Millersville-Tennessee.html#ixzz1c0zE566E

Cities in Robertson County, Tennessee
Cities in Tennessee
Cities in Sumner County, Tennessee
Cities in Nashville metropolitan area